Evaisthisies (Greek: Ευαισθησίες; English: Sensitivities) is the eighth studio album by Greek artist, Katy Garbi. It was released on 17 October 1997 by Sony Music Greece and certified platinum in 2 days, but after months received triple-platinum certification, selling over 160,000 units*. The album was written entirely by Phoebus. It was the second best-selling Greek album of 1997, and Katy's second top-seller album, containing many of her most successful songs like "Ierosilia", "Evaisthisies", "Triferotita" and "Kivotos". On 21 March 2022, was released a vinyl edition of album. The tracklist included live covers and duets as a bonus.

In 1997, triple-platinum was the album whose sales exceeded 150,000 units.

Track listing

Standard edition

LP Re-issue

Bonus 7" Single

Singles and music videos

The success of the album released nine of twelve songs becoming singles to radio stations with music videos and gained massive airplay.

 "Ierosilia" (Ιεροσυλία; Sacrilege)(Director: Giorgos Gavalos) 
 "Mou Leipeis" (Μου Λείπεις; I Miss You) (Director: Vaggelis Kalaitzidis) 
 "Evaisthisies" (Ευαισθησίες; Sensitivities) (Director: Giorgos Gavalos) 
 "Triferotita" (Τρυφερότητα; Tenderness (Director: Vaggelis Kalaitzidis) 
 "I Patrida Mou" (ft. Antonis Vardis) (Η Πατρίδα Μου; My Homeland) (Director: Dimitris Sotas) 
 "Kivotos" (Κιβωτός; Ark) (Vaggelis Kalaitzidis) 
 "Apozimiosi" (Αποζημίωση; Restitution) (Director: Vaggelis Kalaitzidis) 
 "Asimfonia Haraktiron" (ft. Antonis Remos) (Ασυμφωνία Χαρακτήρων; Personality Clash) (Director: Vaggelis Kalaitzidis)

Credits
Credits adapted from liner notes.

Personnel 

 Charis Andreadis – orchestration (tracks: 12)
 Aggelos Avgeris – backing vocals (tracks: 2, 3, 6, 7, 9, 10, 11)
 Hakan Bingolou – säz (tracks: 3, 12)
 Giannis Bithikotsis – bouzouki (tracks: 2, 4, 9, 10, 11) / cura (tracks: 1, 2, 5, 6) / baglama (tracks: 1, 2, 4, 10, 11) / mandolin (tracks: 8)
 Rania Dizikiriki – backing vocals (tracks: 2, 3, 6, 7, 9, 10, 11)
 Antonis Gounaris – guitars (all tracks) / cümbüş (tracks: 6, 7, 9)
 Giotis Kiourtsoglou – bass (tracks: 1, 2, 3, 4, 5, 6, 7, 8, 9, 10, 11)
 Katerina Kiriakou – backing vocals (tracks: 2, 3, 6, 7, 9, 10, 11)
 Dimitris Kokotas – additional backing vocals (tracks: 1, 9)
 Giorgos Kostoglou – bass (tracks: 12)
 Antonis Koulouris – drums (tracks: 12)
 Giorgos Lebesis – additional backing vocals (tracks: 1, 9)
 Fedon Lionoudakis – accordion (tracks: 2, 3, 4, 5, 8, 11)
 Andreas Mouzakis – drums (tracks: 1, 2, 3, 4, 5, 8, 10, 11)
 Alex Panagi – backing vocals (tracks: 2, 3, 6, 7, 9, 10, 11)
 Phoebus – orchestration (tracks: 1, 2, 3, 4, 5, 6, 7, 8, 9, 10, 11) / programming, keyboards (all tracks) / additional backing vocals (tracks: 1, 9)
 Antonis Remos – additional backing vocals (tracks: 1, 9) / second vocal (tracks: 4)
 Giorgos Roilos – percussion (tracks: 1, 2, 3, 5, 6, 7, 8, 9, 10, 11)
 Dionisis Schinas – second vocal (tracks: 8)
 Thanasis Vasilopoulos – clarinet (tracks: 1, 5, 12) / ney (tracks: 9)
 Martha Zioga – backing vocals (tracks: 2, 3, 6, 7, 9, 10, 11)

Production 

 Katia Dimopoulou – cover processing
 Giannis Doulamis – production manager
 Antonis Glikos – art direction
 Giannis Ioannidis (Digital Press Hellas) – mastering
 Giannis Michailidis – hair styling, make up
 Manolis Vlachos (Phase One studio) – sound engineer, mix engineer
 Tasos Vrettos – photographer

Charts

Accolades 
Evaisthisies received three awards at the Pop Corn Music Awards 1998:

 Best Album of the Year
 Best Song Of The Year (Evaisthisies)
 Track With Most Airplay of 1998 on Sfera 102.1 (Evaisthisies)

References

1997 albums
Katy Garbi albums
Albums produced by Phoebus (songwriter)
Greek-language albums
Sony Music Greece albums